Timo Königsmann (born 5 April 1997) is a German professional footballer who plays as a goalkeeper for  club SV Sandhausen.

Career
Königsmann joined 2. Bundesliga club SV Sandhausen on 21 October 2022, after regular goalkeepers Patrick Drewes and Benedikt Grawe were sidelined with injury. He had previously trialled with the club, and according to goalkeepers coach Daniel Ischdonat, Königsmann had "impressed" during training sessions and fit in well with the team.

Honours
Individual
 Fritz Walter Medal U17 Bronze: 2014

References

Living people
1997 births
Association football goalkeepers
German footballers
Germany youth international footballers
Hannover 96 II players
Hannover 96 players
SpVgg Greuther Fürth II players
SpVgg Greuther Fürth players
VfR Aalen players
SV Waldhof Mannheim players
SV Sandhausen players
3. Liga players
Regionalliga players
Footballers from Hanover